A mobile personnel shield is a type of bulletproof shield equipped with wheels. Such devices were employed experimentally during the trench warfare of World War I.

The immobility of the trench warfare characterizing the First World War led to a need for a device that would protect soldiers from enemy fire and could help them move on the extremely irregular terrain of battlefields. The French colonel Jean Baptiste Eugène Estienne considered armed cross-country vehicles such as the future tank as early as August 1914, but also imagined mobile personnel shield to assist individual soldiers.

Apart from a few exceptional cases, these mobile personnel shields proved too cumbersome and heavy for the strength of an individual under fire, and would only work on short distances and on favourable ground.

See also
 History of the tank
 SWAT-Bot
 Ballistic shield
 Riot shield
 Mantlet

Notes

References
 Alain Gougaud L'Aube de la Gloire, Les Autos-Mitrailleuses et les Chars Français pendant la Grande Guerre, 1987, Musée des Blindés, 
 Bruce I. Gudmundsson On armor Greenwood Publishing Group, 2004, 

Shields
Protective gear